Farlowella mariaelenae is a species of armored catfish endemic to Venezuela where it is found in the Orinoco River basin and may occur in the coastal rivers draining into the Caribbean Sea.  This species grows to a length of  SL.

References 
 

mariaelenae
Fish of Venezuela
Endemic fauna of Venezuela
Fish described in 1964